UC Press may refer to:

University of California Press
University of Chicago Press